The 2022 CONIFA South America Football Cup, also referred to as 2022 CONIFA Copa America, was the first edition of the CONIFA South America Football Cup, an international football tournament for states, minorities, stateless peoples and regions unaffiliated with FIFA with an affiliation to South America, organised by CONIFA. It was hosted by Chile.

Tournament
On 24 January 2022, CONIFA announced that Chile would host the first edition of the CONIFA South America Football Cup.

Venues
The tournament was held in the city of Linares and all games are realized in the Estadio Fiscal de Linares.

Mascot
The tournaments official mascot is Dromig, representing one of the 4 marsupials that live in Chile, its name derives from Dromiciops griloides.

Participants

A total of four teams were scheduled to participate:

On June 11, a draw was held to define the competition brackets.

Matches

Bracket 

The tournament's original formula would be held with semi-finals and final

Semi-finals

Third-Place play-off

Final

Round-robin

After the non-attendance of São Paulo FAD the tournament was decided in a single round-robin format. The match between Maule Sur and Mapuche, initially valid for one of the semi-finals, started to be considered as the first round of the dispute.

Top scorers 
2 goals
 Gabriel Loncomilla 
1 goal
 Luis Álvares
 Yerson Tramanil
 Erick Acuña
 Cristián Arrue

External links 

ConifaTV - CONIFA Copa America 2022

References 

CONIFA South America Football Cup
2022 in Chilean football
Sport in Maule Region
CONIFA South American Football Cup